Phlyctaenomorpha sinuosalis is a moth in the family Crambidae. It was described by Ferdinand Le Cerf in 1910. It is found in Iraq and Turkey.

References

Moths described in 1910
Odontiinae